Ermine Power Station is a natural gas-fired station owned by SaskPower, under construction about 10 km southeast of Kerrobert, Saskatchewan, Canada and operated as a peaking plant. The project underwent environmental assessment in 2008.

Description
The Ermine Power Station consists of:
 2 x 46 MW units

References

External links

Natural gas-fired power stations in Saskatchewan
SaskPower